The Barnyard Concert is a Mickey Mouse short animated film first released on April 5, 1930, as part of the Mickey Mouse film series. It was the seventeenth Mickey Mouse short to be produced, the second of that year.

Plot
Mickey Mouse conducts an orchestral performance on the farm, with an orchestra of cats, dogs, horses, cows, pigs and goats. They play the overture from Franz von Suppé's Poet and Peasant at Mickey's direction. Some of the animals find themselves in conflict—a dog's tuba playing disturbs a pig's toupee, and a goat spanks another pig with his violin bow. Mickey creates music by pulling the tails of baby pigs, and a horse plays drums on the rear end of a cow. At the end of the short, Mickey—tired of being hassled by a cow's tail—ties the tail to a bucket of water, and the cow upends the bucket on Mickey's head. Mickey shivers and whimpers as the concert comes to an end.

Production
This is the first cartoon to include a horse and a cow that will soon evolve into Horace Horsecollar and Clarabelle Cow, two members of Mickey's early supporting cast. Neither animal has lines, or the costumes that they will later adopt, but the resemblance is clear. The film has no dialogue.

Some of the animation in this short will be reused in the 1931 short The Castaway.

Mickey will return to the music of Franz von Suppé in 1942's Symphony Hour, when he conducts the Light Cavalry Overture.

Reception

According to Gijs Gorb in Mickey's Movies: The Theatrical Films of Mickey Mouse, "Unfortunately, at this stage, the animators still had problems with Mickey's eyes: in one close-up in particular they are placed awkwardly in his face. In a few other scenes, Mickey still is very bland. His best moments are when he's confronted by a pig repeatedly playing a wrong note on the trumpet and when he gets dragged around by a cow's tail."

It has been noted that this cartoon is an early example of the cinematic cliche of a conductor tapping his baton on the music stand to indicate to the orchestra that the song is about to begin, an action which never happens in actual concert performing. Mickey performs the action again when he plays a conductor in 1935's The Band Concert.

The use of "earthy" barnyard humor has also been noted, with this cartoon serving as an example of the Mickey Mouse series' evolving sense of propriety. In Screen, J.P. Telotte observed: "The cows -- as well as the barnyard world and humor they connote -- do not quite disappear. Rather, they slowly become conventionalized, as in the gradually developing persona of Clarabelle the Cow, for example. They eventually become discreetly clothed, their udders carefully hidden beneath skirts, dresses and uniforms, even their narrative roles altered, as can easily be gauged by comparing the similar subjects of The Barnyard Concert from 1930 and The Band Concert from 1935. In the former, a cow flautist has her udders dangling into the foreground, forming an obstacle as Mickey tries to lead his rustic orchestra, while another cow's rear becomes an instrument for the drummer. In the latter, all the animal players are elaborately uniformed and seemingly disciplined musicians, and rather than leading into a scene or getting in the way, they are increasingly relegated to the background or peripheral spaces of the films."

Motion Picture News (July 5, 1930) said: "Mickey Mouse conducts an orchestra composed of various barnyard animals, the "Poet and Peasant" overture being played from start to finish. There are enough good gags in it to keep the chuckles going at a steady pace."

Home media
The short was released on December 7, 2004 on Walt Disney Treasures: Mickey Mouse in Black and White, Volume Two: 1929-1935.

See also
Mickey Mouse (film series)

References

External links
 
 

Mickey Mouse short films
1930s Disney animated short films
1930 short films
American black-and-white films
1930 animated films
1930 films
Films produced by Walt Disney
American comedy short films
Columbia Pictures short films
Columbia Pictures animated short films
Films set on farms
1930s English-language films
1930s American films